A Very Merry Pooh Year (also known as Winnie the Pooh: A Very Merry Pooh Year) is a 2002 American direct-to-video Christmas animated musical film produced by Walt Disney Animation (France), S.A and the series finale of The New Adventures of Winnie the Pooh. The film features the 1991 Christmas television special Winnie the Pooh and Christmas Too, as well as a new film, Happy Pooh Year. The film animation production was done by Wang Film Productions Co., Ltd., and Sunwoo Animation,  (Korea) Co., Ltd.

It was the only Winnie the Pooh film where Jeff Bennett provided Christopher Robin's
singing voice. It is also the first Winnie-the-Pooh film where Owl does not appear at all, and the first Winnie the Pooh film that Carly Simon is involved in.

Plot
On Christmas Eve, Winnie the Pooh is having trouble setting up his Christmas tree. Pooh slips and falls, and breaks a shelf holding a present he made for Piglet. When Piglet suddenly arrives, Pooh desperately searches for a new hiding place for the present (since the broken shelf can no longer stay up) as more of his friends arrive at the door. Afterwards his friends, tired of waiting for Pooh to answer, they invite themselves in and proceed to help decorate his house. After they settle down to tell stories, Rabbit tells the story of how they almost missed out on getting gifts one year, re-telling the story of Winnie the Pooh and Christmas Too. Afterwards Pooh appears dressed as Santa and exchanges gifts with everyone.

The next morning is Christmas Day and everyone ventures out into the snow to enjoy the aftermath of Christmas as Tigger annoys Rabbit with his collection of jingle bells. After Pooh receives his gift from Piglet, he remembers that he has not yet given Piglet his gift yet, and unable to remember where he put it, searches for it all the way until New Years’ Eve. Christopher Robin finds Pooh, and explains to him how New Years is celebrated. Pooh decides that he’ll ask Rabbit if he can host the party and goes off to propose the idea to him. Meanwhile, Rabbit is focused on preserving a carrot he saved for winter so he can use it to restart his garden come Spring. A series of mishaps, (involving Pooh inviting himself in and eating out of Rabbit’s cupboard, Piglet getting spooked and hiding under his bed, Tigger annoying Rabbit with his bouncing, and Eeyore being in the way and gloomy as usual) a fed-up Rabbit throws them out and declares his plan to leave the Hundred Acre Wood. Not wanting Rabbit to leave, Pooh suggests the idea to use their New Years’ resolutions to change their ways for their friend. Pooh vows to never eat honey again, Piglet agrees to be brave, Tigger vows to not bounce anymore, and Eeyore promises to be more positive. However, their resolutions cause them to switch personalities as a result, Pooh becomes gloomy and downbeat like Eeyore, Piglet becomes zany and bouncy like Tigger, Eeyore develops a taste for honey and dresses in Pooh’s clothes, and Tigger becomes paranoid and panicky like Piglet. Which only makes Rabbit more annoyed and wanting to leave. After leaving, Rabbit finds himself in trouble after tumbling and sliding through the snow and being catapulted into the air by his suitcase.

They all begin searching for Rabbit where they find him about to be abducted by bees. They all rescue him with Tigger bouncing to grab hold of his scarf the bees were using to abduct him and luckily get him down from the tree. They express shame at not being able to keep their resolutions but Rabbit upon discovering their intentions, is touched, and assures them that he loves them just the same, and that if anything, he is the one who needs to change and be more accepting of their quirks and flaws. They reunite with Christopher Robin and return to Rabbit’s house to celebrate New Years, where everyone reconciles and enjoys the festivities as planned. Pooh suddenly remembers  where he put his Piglet's gift and quickly goes back to his house to get it. By the time he returns, Piglet opens the gift to find it’s musical box that he made for him that plays “Auld Lang Syne”. Piglet is thankful for his gift and everybody joins together to sing just as the film closes.

Voice cast
 Jim Cummings as Winnie the Pooh and Tigger 
 Peter Cullen as Eeyore
 John Fiedler as Piglet
 Michael Gough as Gopher
 William Green as Christopher Robin
 Nikita Hopkins as Roo
 Ken Sansom as Rabbit
 Kath Soucie as Kanga
 Michael York as The Narrator
 Jeff Bennett as Piglet and Christopher Robin (singing voice)
 Paul Winchell as Tigger (Winnie the Pooh and Christmas Too sequence, final film role)

Songs

Home media
The film was released as a direct-to-DVD on November 12, 2002. The film was released for the first time on Blu-ray on November 5, 2013 as the "Gift of Friendship Edition", the same day as the 30th Anniversary Blu-ray release for the 1983 animated featurette Mickey's Christmas Carol.

See also
 List of Christmas films

References

External links

 
 
 

2002 animated films
2002 direct-to-video films
2002 films
2000s American animated films
American children's animated adventure films
American children's animated comedy films
American children's animated musical films
American Christmas films
Animated Christmas films
American Christmas comedy films
Direct-to-video sequel films
Disney direct-to-video animated films
DisneyToon Studios animated films
Winnie the Pooh (franchise)
Films set around New Year
Animated anthology films
Winnie-the-Pooh films
2000s Christmas films
Disney Television Animation films
Films scored by Mark Watters
2000s children's animated films
Films directed by Jamie Mitchell (director)
2000s English-language films